Abune-the-Hill is a place on in the North of the Orkney Mainland (59.13° N 03.25° W HY2828) and just to the west of the Loch of Swannay.

Abune-the-Hill means "Above the hill" in the local dialect.

The site of a "Romish Church" is at Abune-the-Hill.

References 

Villages on Mainland, Orkney